Alfred Bert Gray (1890–1967) was an Australian rugby league footballer who played for Glebe in the NSWRL competition in the 1910s and 1920s.

Background
Born in Glebe, New South Wales to parents Ernest and Jane Gray, Gray learnt the game of rugby in the Glebe rugby union juniors before switching to rugby league.

Playing career
Gray went on to play thirteen first grade seasons with Glebe between 1912 and 1927. By the time he retired, aged 37, Gray had represented New South Wales on seven occasions between 1913 and 1920 and Australia on four occasions on the 1921–22 Kangaroo tour of Great Britain. He played in the 1922 Grand Final for the Glebe team that was defeated by North Sydney Bears 35–3. He captained Glebe during the 1925 NSWRFL season. Bert Gray was the elder brother of the St. George Dragons foundation player, Frank Gray.

Death
Gray died on 17 December 1967, aged 77.

References

1890 births
1967 deaths
Australian rugby league players
Glebe rugby league players
New South Wales rugby league team players
Australia national rugby league team players
Rugby league players from Sydney